Arthur Kill Railroad Bridge may refer to one of two railroad bridges between Elizabethport, New Jersey and Staten Island, New York:

Arthur Kill Bridge, from 1888 until 1959
Arthur Kill Vertical Lift Bridge, from 1959 to present